Bigger than Jesus is a misquote by Mick Jagger of a saying by John Lennon, see "More popular than Jesus"

Theatre and TV
Bigger Than Jesus: The Diary of a Rock and Roll Fan, Rick Emerson's one-man stage show, directed Joni DeRouchie
Bigger than Jesus, Rick Miller (comedian)
1 Leicester Square introduced Russell Brand as being "bigger than Jesus" in reference to the misquoted claim by John Lennon

Games
Chain World challenge GDC: The Game Design Challenge: Bigger Than Jesus Game Developers Conference

Music
Bigger Than Jesus, band of Steve Lucas of X (Australian band)

Albums
Bigger than Jesus, fictional second album mentioned in the Simpsons episode Homer's Barbershop Quartet September 30, 1993
 Bigger than Jesus (album), a 1989 album by the Kalahari Surfers aka Warrick Sony

Songs
"Bigger Than Jesus", single by Danbert Nobacon in 1987
"Bigger Than Jesus", single by  the Kalahari Surfers aka Warrick Sony from the 1989 album Bigger than Jesus